Korzec is a former name of Korets in Ukraine.

Korzec may also refer to:
 Korzec, a Pomeranian village in Poland
 korzec, the Polish bushel